Wedding Bells is a 1919 comedic play which played on Broadway.

The play was written by Salisbury Field and staged by Edgar Selwyn, and opened on Broadway on November 12, 1919 at the Harris Theatre.  It played through April 1, 1920, for a total of 168 performances. Prior to opening in New York, initial performances occurred in Washington, D.C.

Wallace Eddinger and Margaret Lawrence played the lead roles.

The play received generally positive reviews, and Burns Mantle included the play on his list of best plays of the season.

It was adapted into a silent film released in 1921 featuring Constance Talmadge.

It also was staged in London, and subsequent to a touring production after closing on Broadway, other productions of the play in the United States were mounted into the 1930s.  Aside from appearing in editions of Burns Mantle's best play lists, the play has subsequently received little attention.

Original Broadway Cast
 Percy Ames as	Spencer Wells
 Maud Andrew as Hooper
 George Burton as Fuzisaki
 Wallace Eddinger as Reginald Carter
 Jessie F. Glendinning as Marcia Hunter
 John Harwood as Jackson
 Margaret Lawrence as Rosalie
 Mrs. Jacques Martin as Mrs. Hunter

References

External links
 

1919 plays
Broadway plays
Comedy plays
American plays adapted into films